Big Korab Gate is a mountain pass on the northern slopes of Mount Korab. It is located on the border of Albania and North Macedonia. 

References

Mountain passes of the Dinaric Alps
Landforms of North Macedonia